Aarons may refer to:

People
 Aarons (surname), people with the surname
 Jesse Aarons, fictional character in the book Bridge to Terabithia by Katherine Paterson
 Aarons., author abbreviation for botanist Aaron Aaronsohn

Places
 Aarons, West Virginia, an unincorporated community
 Aarons Corner, North Carolina, an unincorporated community

See also
 Aaron (disambiguation)
 Aron (disambiguation)
 Aaron's